

eThekwini Municipality 
The following reserves and parks are managed by the eThekwini Municipality, with some forming part of the Durban Metropolitan Open Space System (D'MOSS):

Central region 

 Burman Bush
 Durban Botanic Gardens
 Pigeon Valley

West region 

 Alverstone Wildlife Park
 Alfred Park
 Giba Gorge Nature Reserve
 Iphithi Nature Reserve (in partnership with Gillits Conservancy)
 Madwala Wildlife Sanctuary
 Mariannwood
 New Germany Nature Reserve
 Palmiet Nature Reserve
 Paradise Valley
 Roosfontein
 Springside
 St Helier Dam

South region 

 Amanzimtoti Bird Sanctuary
 Ilanda Wilds
 Illovo Estuary
 Silverglen

North region 

 Danville Park
 Seaton Park
 Umgeni River Bird Park
 Virginia Bush

Ezemvelo KZN Wildlife 
Ezemvelo KZN Wildlife, the provincial conservation authority in KwaZulu-Natal province, manages the following nature reserves within the bounds of the eThekwini Municipality:
 Beachwood Mangroves Nature Reserve
 Bluff Nature Reserve
 Kenneth Stainbank Nature Reserve
 Krantzkloof Nature Reserve
 North Park Nature Reserve
 Umhlanga Lagoon Nature Reserve

Msinsi Holdings 
Msinsi Holdings, a subsidiary of water utility Umgeni Water, manages the following resource reserves in eThekwini:
 Hazelmere Dam
 Inanda Dam
 Shongweni Dam

National Ports Authority 
The National Ports Authority of South Africa manages the following nature reserve:
 Bayhead Natural Heritage Site

WESSA 
WESSA (the Wildlife and Environment Society of South Africa), manages the following reserves, in some cases in partnership with other organisations:
 Clive Cheeseman Nature Reserve
 Empisini Nature Reserve
 Glenholme Nature Reserve (in partnership with the SPCA)
 Hawaan Forest Nature Reserve  (in partnership with Tongaat-Hulett)
 Msinsi Nature Reserve (in partnership with the University of KwaZulu-Natal)

References 

Nature reserves in South Africa
Protected areas of KwaZulu-Natal
eThekwini